Aurahi may refer to several places in Nepal:

Rural/arban municipality
Aurahi Rural Municipality, Dhanusa, a rural municipality in Province No. 2 of Nepal
Aurahi Rural Municipality, Siraha, a rural municipality in Province No. 2 of Nepal
Aurahi, Mahottari, an urban municipality in Province No. 2 of Nepal

Former Village development committee
Aurahi, Saptari, a village in Saptari District
Aurahi, Sarlahi, a village in Sarlahi District